Silja Tillner (born 1960) is an Austrian architect. She is a Principal in the firm Architekten Tillner & Willinger ZT GmbH.

She received a Fulbright Grant to study Architecture at UCLA. Her UCLA master's thesis project was "The End of the Glendale Freeway Urban Design", Los Angeles, California, combining transit with community services.<ref>"Broadening the Discourse" Exhibit Catalogue January 24-March 15, 1992, sponsored by Association for Women in Architecture (AWA) now Association for Women in Architecture and Design (AWA+D), California Women in Environmental Design (CWED), UCLA Extension Interior & Environmental Design Program.</ref> Her notable projects include Gürtel-Urbion (revitalization of Gürtel Boulevard, Retractable Cover of Vienna City Hall, and Spittelau Office Building.

The architect's office is focussing on "Urban Study and -Design, Land- and Site Use Concepts, Public Space Design, Membrane Constructions, Office Buildings, Urban Utitlity Buildings and Residential Buildings". The concept of their website is bilingual: English and German language. The office was originally founded 1995 by Silja Tillner. The cooperation with Dipl.-Ing. Alfred Willinger dates from 2003 and the shared enterprise Tillner & Partner ZT GmbH'' was established in 2005.

References

External links
 Official website of architect's office
 Profile of Architekten Tillner & Willinger ZT GmbH on austria-architects.com
 Profile of Architekten Tillner & Willinger ZT on world-architects.com

Further reading
 http://www.isocarp.net/Data/case_studies/2042.pdf
 https://web.archive.org/web/20131214232902/http://fabricarchitecturemag.com/articles/0404_ac8_roof_drain.html

1960 births
Living people
Austrian women architects
20th-century Austrian architects
21st-century Austrian architects
Architects from Vienna